Enippadikal may refer to:
 Enippadikal (novel), a Malayalam novel by Thakazhi Sivasankara Pillai
 Enippadikal (film), a Malayalam film based on the novel
 Enippadigal, a Tamil-language film